Sir George Pearce (1870–1952) was a Western Australian politician.

George Pearce may also refer to:

 George Pearce (Jamaican cricketer) (born 1864), Jamaican cricketer
 George Pearce (English cricketer) (1908–1986), English cricketer who played for Sussex
 George Pearce (New Zealand politician) (1863–1935), New Zealand politician
 George Pearce (Queensland politician) (1917–1992), MHR for Capricornia
 George Pearce (South Australian politician) (1826–1908), MHA for East Torrens
 George Pearce (actor) (1865–1940), American actor
 George Hamilton Pearce (1921–2015), Archbishop of Fiji

See also
George Pearse (disambiguation)
George Pierce (disambiguation)
George Peirce (disambiguation)